Chuck or Charles Payton or Peyton may refer to:

Charles Alfred Payton (1843–1926),  British adventurer, fisherman, diplomat and writer
Charles Payton (basketball) (born 1960), American former basketball player
Charles Peyton (born 1962), porn actor